The Molave–Dipolog Road, also known as  theMalindang Mountain Road, is an , two-to-four lane, primary national road that connects the provinces of Zamboanga del Norte and Zamboanga del Sur. This road serves as the main highway when going to Dipolog from Pagadian.

The entire highway is designated as National Route 80 (N80) of the Philippine highway network.

References 

Roads in Zamboanga del Norte
Roads in Zamboanga del Sur